George Barker (13 March 1858 – 28 October 1936) was a Welsh Labour Party politician.

Born in Hanley, Barker was educated at Norwood National School before joining the Buffs (Royal East Kent Regiment).  He served in the Anglo-Zulu War before becoming a coal miner in Abertillery.

Barker became active in the South Wales Miners' Federation, and later served as full-time agent to its Monmouthshire and Western Valleys district.  He also served on the executive of the Miners' Federation of Great Britain from 1911 until 1921.

Baker was elected at the member of parliament (MP) for Abertillery at a by-election in 1920, and held the seat until he retired at the 1929 general election.

References 

1858 births
1936 deaths
Miners' Federation of Great Britain-sponsored MPs
Welsh Labour Party MPs
UK MPs 1918–1922
UK MPs 1922–1923
UK MPs 1923–1924
UK MPs 1924–1929